Haroonabad may refer to:

 Haroonabad (Bahawalnagar) in Punjab, Pakistan
 Haroonabad (Karachi) in Sindh, Pakistan

See also
 Harun, the Islamic form of the name of Aaron, the elder brother of Moses
 Haroon  a Muslim name